Howard Justus McGinnis (April 4, 1882 – August 26, 1971) was an interim president of East Carolina Teachers College, now called East Carolina University.

Biography

Early life
Howard Justus McHinnis was born on April 4, 1882, in  Kanawha River (Gilmer County), West Virginia . He attended the Glenville State College and the West Virginia University, where he majored in science.  In 1927, McGinnis obtained a Ph.D. from George Peabody College.

Career
He was hired as a psychology professor at East Carolina Teachers College. He was named acting president in 1944 upon the retirement of Leon Renfroe Meadows and served until August 1946.

Death
He died on August 26, 1971, in Greenville, North Carolina.

Legacy
The McGinnis Theater at East Carolina University is named in his honor.

External links
 East Carolina University Icons Gallery profile
 Records of Howard Justus McGinnis' Tenure Interim President of East Carolina Teachers College, 1944-1946. UA02-03. University Archives, East Carolina University
 McGinnis Theater at East Carolina University

1882 births
1971 deaths
Educators from West Virginia
Presidents of East Carolina University
Glenville State College alumni
West Virginia University alumni
People from Glenville, West Virginia
20th-century American academics